Nikita Dmitrievich Shleikher (born 10 June 1998) is a Russian diver.

Career
Shleikher began practicing diving at the school of Olympic reserve in Penza, where he became a multiple medalist and champion of Russian Junior Championships. In 2012, he won the Junior European Championships in men's 10m platform. He competed at the 2012 World Junior Championships finishing 5th in 10m platform and 7th in 3m springboard. He won a silver and a bronze at the 2014 European Junior Diving Championships.

Shleikher relocated to Kazan and took up residency in the Tatarstan. He finished 5th in 10m platform at the 2014 European Championships in Berlin.

In 2015, Shleikher competed at the inaugural 2015 European Games, where he won gold in 1m springboard but took only 2nd place in 10m platform behind Britain's Matty Lee. He finished 5th in mixed 10 metre platform and 7th in men's 10m platform at the 2015 World Championships in Kazan, thus qualifying him for both events at the 2016 Summer Olympics.

References

External links
Nikita Shleikher
Nikita Shleikher Sports bio

Russian male divers
1998 births
Living people
Sportspeople from Stavropol
Sportspeople from Kazan
European Games gold medalists for Russia
Divers at the 2015 European Games
European Games medalists in diving
European Games silver medalists for Russia
Divers at the 2016 Summer Olympics
Olympic divers of Russia
Universiade medalists in diving
Universiade gold medalists for Russia
Universiade silver medalists for Russia
Medalists at the 2017 Summer Universiade
Divers at the 2020 Summer Olympics